XM3 may refer to:

 XM-3 Rhythm, a satellite operated by XM satellite radio
 XM 3, a radio channel from Sirus XM satellite radio; see List of Sirius XM Radio channels
 Renault Samsung XM3, a South Korean automobile
 Citroën XM 3.0, a French automobile
 South African type XM3 tender, a steam locomotive tender
 Moller XM-3, a VTOL aircraft; see List of aircraft (Mo)
 XM3, a prototype version of the Bradley Fighting Vehicle
 XM-3, a U.S. Army Vietnam War era sensor

See also

 
 XME (disambiguation)
 XM (disambiguation)